What If It All Means Something is the third studio album by Canadian singer-songwriter Chantal Kreviazuk, released in 2002.

Composition
According to MTV Taiwan, the album reflects Kreviazuk's personal emotions during the period leading up to its release by implementing folk-inspired piano and her own guitar. "In This Life" describes unconditional love and "selfless dedication.
Kreviazuk revealed that "Flying Home (Brenda's Song)" was about her cousin, Brenda, who died at a young age.

Track listing
"In This Life" (Kreviazuk) – 3:51
"Time" (Kreviazuk, Raine Maida, Gregg Wattenberg) – 4:07
"What If It All Means Something" (Kreviazuk, Maida) – 4:03
"Julia" (Kreviazuk, J. O'Brien) – 3:43
"Flying Home (Brenda's Song)" (Kreviazuk) – 3:18
"Weight of the World" (Kreviazuk) – 3:33
"Waiting" (Kreviazuk, Maida) – 4:29
"Ready for Your Love" (Kreviazuk, Gerald Eaton, Prophet B.W. West) – 3:38
"Morning Light" (Kreviazuk) – 3:57
"Miss April" (Kreviazuk, Maida) – 3:38
"Turn the Page" (Kreviazuk) – 3:47

US bonus track
"Feels Like Home" (Randy Newman) – 4:41

Japan bonus tracks
"Feels Like Home" (Randy Newman) – 4:41
"Leaving On A Jet Plane" (John Denver) – 4:41
"This Year" (Billy Steinberg, Marti Frederiksen, Leah Andreone) – 2:45

Singles
"In This Life"
"Time"
"Julia"
"What If It All Means Something"
"Weight of the World"

Personnel
Chantal Kreviazuk – piano, keyboards, vocals
Jeff Allen – bass guitar
Sherrod Barnes – acoustic guitar, guitar, electric guitar
Michelle Branch – background vocals
Avril Brown – violin
Cenovia Cummins – violin
Sylvia Davanzo – violin
Jamie Edwards – acoustic guitar, guitar, electric guitar, keyboards
Ralph Farris – conductor, viola
David Gold – viola
Adam Grabois – cello
Joyce Hammann – violin
Conrad Harris – violin
Adam Hyman – viola
John Kalodner – voices
Conway Kuo – viola
Victor Lawrence – cello
Dorothy Lawson – cello
Gerry Leonard – guitar, electric guitar
Shawn Pelton – percussion, drums
Todd Reynolds – violin
Mary Rowell – violin
Gregg Wattenberg – guitar, mandolin, electric guitar
Mary Whitaker – violin
Krystof Witek – violin
Paul Woodiel – violin

Production
Producer: Gregg Wattenberg
Engineers: Ross Petersen, Brian Scheuble, Gregg Wattenberg, Chuck Zwicky
Assistant engineers: Peter Doris, Ricardo Fernandez, Femio Hernández, Claudius Mittendorfer, Ross Petersen
Mixing: Tom Lord-Alge, Brian Malouf
Mastering: Dave Donelly
A&R: Mike Roth
Programming: Shawn Pelton
Guitar technician: Art Smith
Arrangers: Chantal Kreviazuk, Gerald Eaton, Jamie Edwards, Ralph Farris, Brian West
Score: Ralph Farris
Orchestra contractor: Victor Lawrence
Art direction: Gail Marowitz
Design: Michelle Holme
Photography: Raphael Mazzucco

Soundtracks
 "Time" was featured in the end credits of the film Uptown Girls
 "Weight of the World" was featured on the TV series Charmed

Reception
MTV Taiwan also describes "Ready For Your Love" having a "rich oriental style". The channel also described "Julia" and "Miss April" shows the "irony of fame", "Weight of the World" "conveys the need for forgiveness".

Charts
Album – Billboard (North America)

Singles – Billboard (North America)

See also
2002 in music

References 

Chantal Kreviazuk albums
2002 albums
Columbia Records albums